Sven Boekhorst started skating in the early 1990s in Den Bosch, Netherlands. In 2000 he won every contest, which includes winning the Triple Crown (winning X-Games, Gravity Games and World Championships). In his years as a professional skater he also had a character in a videogame: Aggressive Inline,  performed three weeks in a big theatre show on Broadway, NYC, with a theatre group from Amsterdam and got his own Rollerblade pro model "Sven Boekhorst" skate.

After al the experiences from skating as a professional, Sven decided to take his career to the next level by starting SB Events. SB Events is a company that provides professional skating shows for different kind of events, adjustable to every situation. Check out the references for the shows.

Furthermore, SB Events is organising their own events. Taking care of their own production. SB Events can also be used for total video coverage of an event.

SB Events has a creative team who can help by setting up a total new concept (product presentations, product launched etc.). Contact SB Events for more information about custom skating shows.

Results 2018
- Best Trick winner Ghetto Games Ventspil, Latvia

Results 2017
- 1st place NL Contest, Strassbourg Spine
- 2nd place NL Contest, Strassbourg Park
- 2nd place Pannonian Challenge Osijek, Croatie Park 
- 5th place Barcelona Extreme Park 

Results 2013
- 8th place Winterclash Einhoven, Netherlands Park

Results 2012
- 9th place Winterclash Eindhoven, Netherlands Park
- 4th place South Korea Contest, Park

Results 2011
- 5th place Winterclash Eindhoven, Netherlands Park
- 4th place FISE Montpellier, France Park
- 3rd place FISE Montpellier, France Spine
- 2nd place FISE Montpellier, France High Air

Results 2010
- 5th place Winterclash Berlin, Germany Park
- 1st place YOU Messe Berlin, Germany Spine
- 1st place Barcelona Extreme Festival Halfpipe
- 2nd place Bowl contest Lausanne, Switzerland Bowl

Results 2009
- 6th place Winterclash Eindhoven, Netherlands Park

Results 2008
- 4th place Asian X-Games Shanghai, China Halfpipe
- 8th place Asian X-Games Shanghai, China Park
- Best Trick European Championships Montana, Bulgaria
- 2nd place SlammJamm Liverpool, UK Park
- 1st place Barcelona Extreme Festival Halfpipe
- 2nd place YOU Messe Berlin, Germany Halfpipe
- 5th place LG Finals Seattle, USA Halfpipe

Results 2007
- 5th place FISE Montpellier, France Park
- 8th place LG Finals Dallas, TX Park

Results 2006
- 5th place LG Amsterdam, Netherlands Park
- 3rd place LG Birmingham, UK Park
- 3rd place LG Birmingham, UK Halfpipe
- 2nd place LG Berlin, Germany Park
- 4th place LG Berlin, Germany Halfpipe
- 4th place LG Paris, France Halfpipe
- 3rd place LG San Diego, CA Halfpipe
- 3rd place Pro Rad São Paulo, Brazil Halfpipe

Results 2005
- 8th place LG Moscow, Russia Halfpipe
- 4th place LG Munich, Germany Park
- 7th place LG Rimini, Italy Park
- 9th place LG Finals Manchester, UK Park
- 2nd place Asian X-Games Seoul, South Korea Park
- 3rd place Asian X-Games Seoul, South Korea Halfpipe
- 3 weeks performing on Broadway NYC

Results 2004
- 5th place ASA Finals Ontario, CA Park

Results 2003
- 3rd place X-Games Los Angeles, CA Park
- 5th place X-Games Los Angeles, CA Halfpipe
- 4th place Global X-Games San Antonio, TX Park
- 1st place Global X-Games San Antonio, TX Park

Results 2002
- 3rd place X-Trails Dallas, TX Park
- 1st place X-Trails Atlanta, USA Park
- 1st place European X-Games Barcelona, Spain Park
- 1st place European Championships Rome, Italy Park
- 2nd place European Championships Rome, Italy Halfpipe

Results 2001
- 1st place ASA Baltimore, USA Park
- 2nd place ASA Rome, Italy Park
- 4th place X-Games Philadelphia, USA Park
- 3rd place European X-Games Barcelona, Spain Park
- 4th ASA Finals World Championships Dallas, TX Park

Resul6s 2000
1st place X-Trails St. Petersburg, FL Park
1st place X-Trails Nashville Park
1st place X-Games San Francisco, CA Park
1st place X-Games Melbourne, Australia Park
1st place Gravity Games Rhode Island, PR Park
1st place YOZ Games Munich, Germany Park
1st place ASA Ontario, CA Park
1st place ASA Hermosa Beach, CA Park
1st place ASA Finals World Championships Las Vegas, NV Park

Results 1999
- 1st place Gravity Games Rhode Island, PR Park
- 1st place X-Games San Francisco, CA Park
- 1st place Dutch Championships Halfpipe
- 2nd place IISS Rome, Italy Park
- 1st place ASA Stockholm, Sweden Park
- 1st place ASA Toronto, Canada Park
- 1st place European Championships Park

Results 1998
- 1st place Dutch championships Park
- 1st place IISS Saas Fee, Switzerland Park
- 1st place IISS Tignes, France Park
- 1st place NISS Finals Venice Beach, CA Park
- 1st place IISS Finals Birmingham, UK Park
- 3rd place ASA Naples, FL Park
- 2nd place ASA Flensburg, Germany Park
- 1st place ASA Toronto, Canada Park
- 3rd place X-Games San Diego, CA Halfpipe triples

Results 1997
- 1st place Dutch Championships Halfpipe
- 3rd place Lausanne contest Halfpipe
- Overall winner IISS Finals Amsterdam

Results 1996
- 2nd place  Dutch Championships Park
- 5th place Dutch Championships Halfpipe
- 1st place Skate 96 Rotterdam Ahoy Park

Results 1995
- 3rd place Dutch Championships Park

References

External links
lgactionsports.com
skatelog.com
svenboekhorst.com
plus2sport.com
ganz-muenchen.de
xsk8.de
skate.de
plaats.nl

1980 births
Living people
X Games athletes
Vert skaters